Castelló d'Empúries is a town and municipality in the Alt Empordà in Girona, Catalonia, Spain. It lies 9 km east of Figueres.

In 1079, Castelló d'Empúries became the capital of the Empúries county due to the previous capital, Sant Martí d'Empúries, being too easily sacked by pirates.  1325-1341 saw a period of large expansion of this capital town, which ultimately ceased being the capital once the county joined the Crown of Aragon in 1385.

The old town is somewhat dwarfed by the neighboring urbanisation of Empuriabrava, on the coastline of the Costa Brava.

Notable people
 Pilar Nouvilas i Garrigolas (1854-1938), painter

See also
County of Empúries
Empúries
Empuriabrava

References

External links 

 Castelló d'Empúries-Empuriabrava (espai web de l'Ajuntament)
 Government data pages 

Municipalities in Alt Empordà